Edirne Province is a Turkish province located in East Thrace. Part of European Turkey, it is one of only three provinces located entirely within continental Europe. Edirne Province is bordered by Tekirdağ Province and Kırklareli Province to the east, and the Gallipoli peninsula of Çanakkale Province to the south-east. It shares international borders with Bulgaria (Haskovo and Yambol Provinces) to the north and Greece (Eastern Macedonia and Thrace) to the west.

Edirne is the capital of the province, and the largest city.

History 
Edirne, capital of the province is notable for serving as the third capital of the Ottoman Empire from 1363 to 1453.

Edirne province was included in the Second Inspectorate General which was created on the 19 February 1934 and extended over the provinces of Edirne, Çanakkale, Kırklareli, Tekirdağ. It was ruled by an Inspector General, who had wide-ranging authorities over civilian, military and educational matters. The office of the Inspectorate-General was abandoned in 1948 but the legal framework of the Inspectorate-Generals was only abolished in 1952, under the Government of the Democrat Party.

Demographics

Districts 

Edirne province is divided into 9 districts (capital district in bold):
Edirne
Enez
Havsa
İpsala
Keşan
Lalapaşa
Meriç
Süloğlu
Uzunköprü

Gallery

See also
Edirne Vilayet
List of populated places in Edirne Province

References

External links 

  
  
 Pictures of the capital of this province with its many great mosques
 Edirne Weather Forecast Information